Bangar May be related to :

Geology 
 Khadir and Bangar, alluvial soil types in India and Pakistan

Places
 Bangar, Brunei, a town in Brunei
 Bangar, India a town in Rajasthan, India
 Bangar, Iran (disambiguation), places in Iran
 Bangar, La Union, a municipality in the Philippines
 Mukim Bangar, a mukim subdivision in Brunei

People
 Bangar (caste), a Hindu and Sikh group of India